2ME Radio Arabic is a narrowcast Arabic language radio station based in Parramatta, broadcasting on 1638AM to Sydney, Melbourne, Hobart and Darwin; 1647AM to Brisbane and Adelaide; and 1656AM to Perth and Canberra.

History
2ME is Australia's first 24-hour commercially owned Arabic-language radio station. Transmission began in Sydney in 1996 and in Melbourne in 1998.

The company also supplies Arabic programming for the in-flight entertainment service on Royal Brunei Airlines and Gulf Air.

Programming
The station features Arabic and English language music following both a Classic Hits and Top 40 format. 2ME broadcasts local and national news along with BBC World News on the hour. The programming day is broken into traditional shifts with an emphasis on talkback and listener participation during the day. Evening programs concentrate on music and live concerts.

See also	
 List of radio stations in Australia

References

External links

Arab-Australian culture
Arabic-language radio stations
Radio stations established in 1996
Radio stations in Sydney
Radio stations in Melbourne
Radio stations in Brisbane
Radio stations in Adelaide
Radio stations in Perth, Western Australia
Radio stations in Hobart
Radio stations in Darwin, Northern Territory
Ethnic radio stations in Australia